Retrospective is a compilation album of Bunny Wailer's work from 1986 to 1992. 
The album was originally released by Wailer's own Solomonic Music/Shanachie Records in 1995, and was re-released in 2003 by RAS Records.

Track listing
	"Roots, Radics, Rockers, Reggae" 1
	"Rock 'N' Groove" 2
	"Love Fire" 1
	"Soul Rebel"  3
	"Want to Come Home"  4
	"Ballroom Floor"  5
	"Rise and Shine"  4
	"Cool Runnings"  2
	"Rockers"  1
	"Liberation"  4
	"Time Will Tell"  3
	"Warrior"  6
	"Dance Hall Music"  7
	"Dog War"  6
	"Conscious Lyrics"  2
	"Redemption Song"  3

11,3,9 taken from In I Father's House (1979)/Roots Radics Rockers Reggae (1983)
22,8,15 taken from Rock 'n' Groove (1981)
34,11,16 taken from Time Will Tell: A Tribute to Bob Marley (1990)
45,7,10 taken from Liberation (1988)
56 taken from Rootsman Skanking (1987)
612,14 taken from Gumption (1990)
713 taken from Marketplace (1985)

References

1995 compilation albums
Bunny Wailer albums
Shanachie Records albums